"Sun" is a song by Northern Irish indie rock band Two Door Cinema Club from their second studio album, Beacon (2012). The song was released on 16 November 2012 as the album's second single. The Gildas Kitsuné Club Night Short Remix of "Sun" appears on Kitsuné Maison Compilation 14: The 10th Anniversary Issue. The accompanying music video premiered on 11 October 2012.

Track listing
iTunes EP – Remixes
"Sun" – 3:07
"Sun" (Fred Falke Remix) – 6:34
"Sun" (Gildas Kitsuné Club Night Remix) – 4:07
"Sun" (Alex Metric Remix) – 5:17

Personnel
Credits adapted from Beacon album liner notes.

Two Door Cinema Club
 Alex Trimble – vocals, drums, guitar, percussion, piano, programming, synthesiser
 Kevin Baird – bass, synthesiser, vocals
 Sam Halliday – guitar, synthesiser, vocals

Additional personnel
 Sam Bell – engineer
 Mike Crossey – mixing
 Eric Gorfain – orchestration
 Jacknife Lee – additional engineer, producer, programming
 Robin Schmidt – mastering

Charts

Certifications

Release history

References

2012 singles
Kitsuné singles
Two Door Cinema Club songs
2012 songs
Song recordings produced by Jacknife Lee